Adenosine monophosphate (AMP), also known as 5'-adenylic acid, is a nucleotide. AMP consists of a phosphate group, the sugar ribose, and the nucleobase adenine. It is an ester of phosphoric acid and the nucleoside adenosine. As a substituent it takes the form of the prefix adenylyl-.

AMP plays an important role in many cellular metabolic processes, being interconverted to ADP and/or ATP. AMP is also a component in the synthesis of RNA. AMP is present in all known forms of life.

Production and degradation
AMP does not have the high energy phosphoanhydride bond associated with ADP and ATP.  AMP can be produced from ADP:

 2 ADP → ATP + AMP

Or AMP may be produced by the hydrolysis of one high energy phosphate bond of ADP:

 ADP  +  H2O → AMP + Pi

AMP can also be formed by hydrolysis of ATP into AMP and pyrophosphate:

 ATP  +  H2O → AMP + PPi

When RNA is broken down by living systems, nucleoside monophosphates, including adenosine monophosphate, are formed.

AMP can be regenerated to ATP as follows:

 AMP + ATP → 2 ADP (adenylate kinase in the opposite direction)
 ADP + Pi → ATP (this step is most often performed in aerobes by the ATP synthase during oxidative phosphorylation)

AMP can be converted into IMP by the enzyme myoadenylate deaminase, freeing an ammonia group.

In a catabolic pathway, adenosine monophosphate can be converted to uric acid, which is excreted from the body in mammals.

Physiological role in regulation

AMP-activated kinase regulation 
The eukaryotic cell enzyme 5' adenosine monophosphate-activated protein kinase, or AMPK, utilizes AMP for homeostatic energy processes during times of high cellular energy expenditure, such as exercise. Since ATP cleavage, and corresponding phosphorylation reactions, are utilized in various processes throughout the body as a source of energy, ATP production is necessary to further create energy for those mammalian cells. AMPK, as a cellular energy sensor, is activated by decreasing levels of ATP, which is naturally accompanied by increasing levels of ADP and AMP.

Though phosphorylation appears to be the main activator for AMPK, some studies suggest that AMP is an allosteric regulator as well as a direct agonist for AMPK. Furthermore, other studies suggest that the high ratio of AMP:ATP levels in cells, rather than just AMP, activate AMPK. For example, the species of Caenorhabditis elegans and Drosophila melanogaster and their AMP-activated kinases were found to have been activated by AMP, while species of yeast and plant kinases were not allosterically activated by AMP.

AMP binds to the γ-subunit of AMPK, leading to the activation of the kinase, and then eventually a cascade of other processes such as the activation of catabolic pathways and inhibition of anabolic pathways to regenerate ATP. Catabolic mechanisms, which generate ATP through the release of energy from breaking down molecules, are activated by the AMPK enzyme while anabolic mechanisms, which utilize energy from ATP to form products, are inhibited. Though the γ-subunit can bind AMP/ADP/ATP, only the binding of AMP/ADP results in a conformational shift of the enzyme protein. This variance in AMP/ADP versus ATP binding leads to a shift in the dephosphorylation state for the enzyme. The dephosphorylation of AMPK through various protein phosphatases completely inactivates catalytic function. AMP/ADP protects AMPK from being inactivated by binding to the γ-subunit and maintaining the dephosphorylation state.

cAMP

AMP can also exist as a cyclic structure known as cyclic AMP (or cAMP). Within certain cells the enzyme adenylate cyclase makes cAMP from ATP, and typically this reaction is regulated by hormones such as adrenaline or glucagon.  cAMP plays an important role in intracellular signaling.

See also

References

Further reading

External links 
 GMD MS Spectrum

Adenosine receptor agonists
Neurotransmitters
Nucleotides
Phosphate esters
Purines